South West Aviation was a British airline formed in 1966 to undertake air charter work from a base at Exeter Airport, Devon, England. In 1973 the airline was taken over by Skyways Aviation.

History
After it was formed the company operated air taxi and charter work with a twin-engined Piper Aztec and Beechcraft Travel Air. In May 1968 the company bought a Douglas DC-3 which enabled it to expand into passenger and freight charters from both Exeter Airport and Hurn Airport. A second DC-3 was soon acquired. The charters were flown around the British Isles, Channel Islands and into Northern France.

Also in 1968 the company bought a Short Skyvan which enabled it to operate out of small grass airfield in South West England for charters and parachute drooping, although the aircraft was also used to operate a scheduled service between Heathrow and Plymouth. The airline also operated summer time scheduled services between Exeter, Cherbourg and Southampton and on behalf of Dan-Air a service between Bristol and the Isle of Mann.

Fleet

See also
 List of defunct airlines of the United Kingdom

Notes

References
 

Defunct airlines of the United Kingdom
Airlines established in 1966
1966 establishments in England